Joseph Carl von Anrep (Iosif Romanovich Anrep-Elmpt; 6 February 1798 – 28 June 1860) was a Baltic German general during the Crimean War.  He was a member of the Russian branch of the Anrep family, the son of Heinrich Reinhold von Anrep, a general of the Russian cavalry during the Napoleonic Wars.

Biography
Anrep married Cecelia Julie Philippine Elmpt. On 6 May 1853, by edict of the Tzar, he was styled Count Anrep-Elmpt in order to preserve the title of his wife's grandfather, Count von Elmpt, who had no other heir. At the start of the Crimean War, Anrep was a colonel in Russian army, but he was quickly promoted to general.  He commanded the Russian troops at the siege of Calafat. Anrep died in 1860. He was the owner of Kärstna manor in present-day Estonia. His son, Reinhold von Anrep-Elmpt, was an explorer.

References

Imperial Russian Army generals
Russian military personnel of the Crimean War
Russian nobility
1796 births
1860 deaths